The demographics of Antwerp are monitored by Statistics Belgium. The population of the city as of 2022 is currently 530,630.

Population

Growth rate 
Antwerp as a city has grown and declined in population size throughout its history.

Age structure 
The age structure of the city is as follows for 2022;

Fertility and births 
In 2019, a total of 7,398 were born in total

Gender 
There are slightly more men in the city of Antwerp then females.

Language 
As in all Flemish provinces, the official and standard language of the Antwerp province is Dutch. As with Flemish Brabant, North Brabant and Brussels, the local dialect is a Brabantian variety.

Religion 
The Religion of the City of Antwerp has historically been that of Roman Catholic. Due to modern migration however, there has been an introduction of non-Christian religions to the city such as the growth of Islam.

Origin 
In 2010, 36% to 39% of the inhabitants of Antwerp had a migrant background.

In 2022, 22% of the city did not have Belgian nationality (classified as a 'non-Belgian').

References 

Antwerp
Antwerp
Antwerp